Agonochaetia intermedia is a moth of the family Gelechiidae. It is found in Austria, Switzerland, Hungary and Russia (the Volga-Don region and the southern Ural).

References

Moths described in 1968
Agonochaetia
Moths of Europe